Stevens Point Area Public School District is a public school district centered in Stevens Point, Wisconsin. It serves the city of Stevens Point, the villages of Junction City, Plover and Whiting; and surrounding towns. It includes two high school, three junior high schools, nine elementary schools, and six specialized schools. Its superintendent is Craig Gerlach.

Schools

High schools
Stevens Point Area Senior High School
Charles F. Fernandez Center

Junior high schools
Ben Franklin Junior High School
P.J. Jacobs Junior High School
Point of Discovery School (PODS)

Elementary schools
Roosevelt IDEA Elementary
Bannach Elementary School
Kennedy Elementary School
Madison Elementary School
McDill Elementary School
Plover-Whiting Elementary School
Washington Elementary School
McKinley Center
Jefferson Elementary School

Specialized Facilities
4K Program
Boston School Forest
Online Learning Center (OLC)
Project Search
Rural Virtual Academy
Summer School

References

External links
Stevens Point Area Public School District

School districts in Wisconsin
Education in Portage County, Wisconsin